MS Prinsendam may refer to:
 MS Prinsendam (1972), which sank in 1980.
 MS Prinsendam (1988), formerly Royal Viking Sun and Seabourn Sun.

Ship names